The Green Lake Yacht Club is a private yacht club located in Green Lake, Wisconsin, United States. It's one of the members of the Inland Lake Yachting Association (ILYA).

History 
The Green Lake Yacht Club, organized in 1894, was one of the first yacht clubs in the state.

Fleets 
At the present time the club is home of the following One-Design racing fleets: 
E-Scow Fleet 
Laser Fleet 
Snipe Fleet #129
Optimist Fleet

Regattas 
GLYC hosted the 10th Annual A-Scow National Championship in 2015, and the ILYA I-20 Invitational Regatta in 2009 and 2015.

References

External links 
 Official website

1894 establishments in Wisconsin
Sailing in Wisconsin
Yacht clubs in the United States